The LCDR R class was a class of 0-4-4T locomotives on the London, Chatham and Dover Railway (LCDR). No. 207 (eventually no. 31666) is notable as being the last former LCDR locomotive to be withdrawn from service. The whole class was fitted with condensing apparatus for working on the Widened Lines.

History
For many years the London, Chatham and Dover Railway (LCDR) had favoured the 0-4-4T wheel arrangement for suburban and stopping passenger trains, and when more were required in 1890, consideration was given to ordering a further batch of the existing A2 class 0-4-4T (introduced 1883); it was then decided that a modified design was required. The R class locomotives were designed by William Kirtley as a development of his earlier A2 class, and 18 were built by Sharp, Stewart and Company in 1891.

Numbering
Their LCDR numbers were 199–216, which under the South Eastern and Chatham Railway became 658–675 from 1899. They were renumbered three more times: to A658–A675 by the Southern Railway (SR) from 1923; to 1658–1675 by the SR from 1931; and to 31658–31675 by British Railways from 1948.

Withdrawal
Three (nos. 1664, 1668 & 1669) were withdrawn in 1940 to provides spares for the others, and withdrawal of the rest occurred between 1949 and 1955.

See also
LCDR R1 class

Notes

References

R
0-4-4T locomotives
Railway locomotives introduced in 1891
Sharp Stewart locomotives
Condensing steam locomotives
Scrapped locomotives
Standard gauge steam locomotives of Great Britain